Melaleuca violacea is a plant in the myrtle family Myrtaceae and is endemic to a small area in the south-west of Western Australia. It is a small, straggly, prostrate to semi-prostrate shrub with purple flowers and star-shaped fruit.

Description 

Purple or violet flowers appear on old wood, individually or in groups of up to six and usually in spring. The stamens are arranged in five bundles around the flower, each bundle with up to 25 stamens. The persistent sepals produce a star shape when the fruits are viewed end-on.

Taxonomy and naming
This species was first formally described in 1844 by Johannes Conrad Schauer in Plantae Preissianae. The specific epithet (violacea) is a Latin word meaning "violet-coloured" referring to the colour of the flowers.

Distribution and habitat
Melaleuca violacea occurs from Ravensthorpe to Walpole and as far inland as the Stirling Range and Ongerup district. It grows in sandy or clayey soils over limestone or laterite on low ridges, undulating terrain and swamps.

Conservation
Melaleuca violacea is classified as "not threatened" by the Government of Western Australia Department of Parks and Wildlife.

Use in horticulture
It is grown from cuttings to maintain its properties and is hardy. It grows well in full sun or semi-shade and in a wide range of soils.

References

violacea
Myrtales of Australia
Rosids of Western Australia
Plants described in 1844
Endemic flora of Western Australia
Taxa named by Johannes Conrad Schauer